Swanlea School is a co-educational comprehensive secondary school in Whitechapel with approximately 1300 students on roll and a further 210 at Key Stage 5. It is situated in the heart of the historic east end of London and less than a mile away from the City of London; it serves the local community.

Swanlea was one of the first schools in the country to be awarded Business and Enterprise specialist status by the DCFS in 2002, and in its recent inspection by OFSTED (2013) Swanlea was judged to be outstanding in all areas.

The school holds the Healthy Schools Award, Investors in People Award, Artsmark Silver Award, are Stonewall School Champions and is a UCL Beacon School in Holocaust Education.

There are over 60 permanent teaching staff and more than 100 support/administrative staff working here.

Swanlea has only had two Headteachers, Linda Austin and currently, Brenda Landers. Linda Austin retired in January 2011 after 18 years of service, and was awarded an OBE for services to Education in the Queen's birthday honours list in 2011.

Swanlea School was designed by Percy Thomas Partnership with Hampshire County Architects. It opened in 1993 and was the first secondary school built in London for over 10 years. The school was built around a central covered 'street' with a dramatic curved glass roof and was passively heated and ventilated.

References

External links
 Swanlea School official website

Whitechapel
Secondary schools in the London Borough of Tower Hamlets
Percy Thomas buildings
Community schools in the London Borough of Tower Hamlets